Jared Jay DeVries  (born June 11, 1976) is a former American football defensive end. He played college football for the University of Iowa, and earned All-American honors.  He was drafted by the Detroit Lions in the third round of the 1999 NFL Draft, and played his entire professional career for the Lions.  He is currently the head coach for the Clear Lake High School football team.

Early years
DeVries was born in Aplington, Iowa.  He attended Aplington–Parkersburg High School, where he was a Blue Chip Illustrated high school All-American and All-Midwest pick as a senior at defensive end in 1993, as well as a Class 1A all-state selection as a senior and junior.  He also played as a fullback and gained over 4,000 yards.

College career
DeVries attended the University of Iowa, and played for the Iowa Hawkeyes football team from 1995 to 1998.  He holds the Hawkeyes' team record for career quarterback sacks with 43 and tackles-for-loss with 79. As a freshman, he started every game in 1995, recording 54 tackles, 12 sacks and 19 tackles-for-loss and was named MVP of the 1995 Sun Bowl vs. Washington. As a sophomore in 1996, he was a Football News All-American third-team pick after recording 22 tackles-for-loss tying the school's single season record. As a junior in 1997 he was named an Associated Press and Football News All-American second-team selection as well as the team's Co-MVP after starting ever game at left defensive tackle.  As a senior in 1998, he was an All-Big Ten first-team selection for the third straight season, and was recognized as a consensus first-team All-American.

Professional career
DeVries was selected by the Detroit Lions in the third round (70th overall) of the 1999 NFL Draft.

As a rookie DeVries played in just two games, due to a foot injury suffered during training camp. He made his NFL debut against the Washington Redskins on December 5, 1999. In 2000 season, he recorded 35 tackles. He earned his first career start against the New York Giants. In 2001, he started the season on the Physically-Unable-to-Perform (PUP) list while recovering from a blood clot suffered during an off-season workout. In 2002, he recorded his first career sack, sacking Minnesota Quarterback Daunte Culpepper for a loss of four yards. In 2003, he had a career best two starts and two forced fumbles. In 2004, DeVries was a member of the Lions' "wedge" on kickoff returns, helping block for kick returner Eddie Drummond, who finished the season ranked second in the NFL in kickoff returns. On the season DeVries had a career high three sacks. He also received the Ed Block Courage Award. In 2005, he again recorded three sacks. In 2006 he started a career best nine games, recording a career high 37 tackles. He recorded his first career safety after he touched down Patriots fullback Heath Evans in the endzone after Evans recorded a Tom Brady fumble. In 2007, he recorded a career high 6.5 sacks and three fumble recoveries and 54 tackles. In 2008, DeVries started nine games and recorded 45 tackles and two sacks. In 2009, he was placed on injured reserve before the start of the season with a torn Achilles tendon. After the season, on February 23, 2010, the Lions released him. However, he was re-signed on April 11.

Personal life
DeVries and wife, Jamie, have two sons: Jaylen and Easton. In 2006, he helped purchase and shop for emergency relief supplies for Hurricane Katrina victims. He also donated Lions' home game tickets to the Children's Hospital of Michigan and Our Children's Homestead through the Lions CATS (Caring Athletes Ticket Service) for Kids program. Took part for fourth-straight year in the 2007 Lions Pet Calendar that helps to raise money for the Dearborn Animal Shelter.  Jared is now the Clear Lake Lions head football coach in Clear Lake, Iowa. His son, Jaylen, is currently a sophomore quarterback for the Southern Illinois University Salukis football team.

Jared's older brother, Darian DeVries, is the head coach for the Drake Bulldogs men's basketball team.

References

External links
 Detroit Lions bio

1976 births
Living people
All-American college football players
American football defensive ends
American people of Dutch descent
Detroit Lions players
Iowa Hawkeyes football players
Players of American football from Iowa
People from Parkersburg, Iowa
Ed Block Courage Award recipients